Irene Guerrero Sanmartín (born 12 December 1996), simply known as Irene, is a Spanish professional footballer who plays as central midfielder for Primera División club Levante UD and the Spain women's national team.

International career
Irene made her senior debut for Spain on 5 April 2019 in a 2–1 friendly victory over Brazil. She scored her first international goal the following month against Cameroon.

International goals

References

External links

1996 births
Living people
Women's association football midfielders
Spanish women's footballers
Footballers from Seville
Spain women's international footballers
Primera División (women) players
Real Betis Féminas players
UEFA Women's Euro 2022 players
21st-century Spanish women